Each team's roster consisted of at least 15 skaters (forwards, and defencemen) and 2 goaltenders, and at most 20 skaters and 3 goaltenders. All eight participating nations, through the confirmation of their respective national associations, had to submit a roster by the first IIHF directorate.

Age and team as of 28 March 2015.

Group A

Canada
The roster was announced on 12 March 2015. Caroline Ouellette replaced Haley Irwin, who was unable to participate through an injury, on 18 March 2015.

Head coach: Doug Derraugh

Finland
A 24-player roster was announced on 16 March 2015. The final roster was named on 24 March 2015.

Head coach: Pasi Mustonen

Russia
A 30-player roster was announced on 11 March 2015, while the final roster was named on 21 March 2015.

Head coach: Mikhail Chekanov

United States
The roster was announced on 15 February 2015.

Head coach: Ken Klee

Group B

Germany
A 26-player roster was announced on 11 March 2015. The final roster was revealed on 24 March 2015.

Head coach: Benjamin Hinterstocker

Japan
The roster was announced on 11 March 2015.

Head coach: Yoshifumi Fujisawa

Sweden
A 39-player roster was announced on 10 March 2015 which was trimmed to 24 on 17 March 2015.

Head coach: Leif Boork

Switzerland
A first roster was announced on 4 February 2015, which was trimmed to 26on 17 March 2015. The final roster was named on 26 March 2015.

Head coach: Gian-Marco Crameri

References

rosters
IIHF Women's World Championship rosters